Hi-Fly is an album by pianist Jaki Byard recorded in 1962 and released on the New Jazz label.

Reception

Allmusic awarded the album 4 stars with its review by Robert Taylor stating, "it would be virtually impossible, and futile, to try and duplicate the individual genius of Jaki Byard. This stands as one of his best".

Track listing 
All compositions by Jaki Byard except where noted
 "Hi-Fly" (Randy Weston) – 3:58  
 "Tillie Butterball" – 5:13  
 "Excerpts from "Yamecraw"" – 4:36  
 "There Are Many Worlds" – 5:27  
 "Here to Hear" – 7:44  
 "Lullaby of Birdland" (George Shearing, George David Weiss) – 3:22  
 "'Round Midnight" (Thelonious Monk) – 4:56  
 "Blues in the Closet" (Oscar Pettiford) – 4:28

Personnel

Musicians 
Jaki Byard – piano
Ron Carter – bass
Pete La Roca – drums

Production 
Esmond Edwards – production
Nat Hentoff – liner notes

References 

Jaki Byard albums
1962 albums
Albums produced by Esmond Edwards
Albums recorded at Van Gelder Studio
New Jazz Records albums